Elizabeth Anne Reid AO, FASSA, (born 3 July 1942) is an Australian development practitioner, feminist and academic with a distinguished career in and significant contribution to national and international public service. She founded, established and worked with a number of pioneering and specialised United Nations institutions, government agencies and non-governmental organisations. Reid was appointed the world's first advisor on women's affairs to a head of government by the Australian Labor Government of Gough Whitlam in 1973.

Early life and education
Reid was born in Taree, New South Wales. At 19 she began a Statistics Cadet and became a Program Officer for the Australian Bureau of Statistics and from 1964 to 1966 she was a computer programmer and training officer. She went on to complete a Bachelor of Arts with First Class Honours at the Australian National University in 1965. Subsequently she was awarded a Commonwealth Travelling Scholarship and completed a Bachelor of Philosophy at Somerville College of the University of Oxford in 1970. She returned to Australia and worked as a Senior Tutor in the Department of Philosophy at the Australian National University from 1970 to 1973. During 1976 Reid was a Fellow at the Institute of Politics and the John F. Kennedy School of Government at Harvard University.

Professional career
Reid was the Australian Representative to the United Nations Forum on the Role of Women in Population and Development, held in New York in February 1974. She has performed many roles in the areas of international development and women's rights for the United Nations and other bodies including Director and Policy Adviser of the United Nations Development Program from 1989 to 1998. She was the Leader of the Australian Delegation to the World Conference of the International Women's Year in Mexico City in 1975.

She has 30 years of professional development experience in Asia, Africa, the Pacific, the Middle East, the Caribbean, Central America, Eastern Europe and the Commonwealth of Independent States.

Reid has had a long career with the United Nations, including milestones such as Founding Director of the United Nations Development Programme HIV and Development Program in New York from 1992 to 1997), Director of the United Nations Development Programme Division for Women in Development from 1989 to 1991 and Founding Director of the United Nations Asian and Pacific Centre for Women and Development in Tehran, Iran from 1977 to 1979.

She is a visiting fellow at the Gender Relations Centre and the School of International, Political and Strategic Studies of the College of Asia and the Pacific at the Australian National University.

Reid continues with her development practice and is also Senior Adviser to the  Collaboration for Health in Papua New Guinea, a Public-Private Partnership for Health.

As part of her work with Collaboration for Health in Papua New Guinea and the ANU Gender Relations Centre in 2002 Reid convened and chaired an International Roundtable on Increasing Access to HIV Care and Treatment in Resource Poor Settings.

The organisations Reid consults with includes the UN System, where she is involved in capacity building for a unified United Nations System response to the HIV epidemic as well as national HIV policy development and implementation.

Honours
In 2001 Reid was appointed an Officer of the Order of Australia "for service to international relations, particularly through the United Nations Development Program, to the welfare of women, and to HIV/AIDS policy development, both in Australia and internationally". She was elected as a Fellow of the Academy of the Social Sciences in Australia in 1996 and received a citation in the Centenary of Federation Honour Roll of Women in 2014.

References

External links
https://web.archive.org/web/20130409173917/http://www.pioneerwomen.com.au/content/view/9/10/

1942 births
Living people
Australian feminists
Australian National University alumni
Academic staff of the Australian National University
Officers of the Order of Australia
People from Taree
Fellows of the Academy of the Social Sciences in Australia
Alumni of Somerville College, Oxford